The 2005 Virginia Cavaliers football team represented the University of Virginia in the 2005 NCAA Division I-A football season. The team's head coach was Al Groh. They played their home games at Scott Stadium in Charlottesville, Virginia.

Schedule

Personnel

References

Virginia
Virginia Cavaliers football seasons
Music City Bowl champion seasons
Virginia Cavaliers football